The Llanos de Moxos, also known as the Beni savanna or Moxos plains, is a tropical savanna ecoregion of the Beni Department of northern Bolivia.

Setting
Most of the Llanos de Moxos lies within the departments of El Beni, Cochabamba, La Paz, Pando, and Santa Cruz. The Llanos de Moxos occupies the southwestern corner of the Amazon basin, and the region is crossed by numerous rivers that drain the eastern slope of the Andes Mountains. The low relief of the savannas, coupled with wet season rains and snowmelt from the Andes, cause up to half the land to flood seasonally.

The Llanos de Moxos is surrounded by tropical moist forests; the Southwestern Amazonian moist forests to the north, west, and south, and the Madeira-Tapajós moist forests to the east.

Climate
The climate of the Llanos de Moxos is tropical, with pronounced wet and dry seasons. The wet season generally extends from December to May, and annual rainfall ranges from 1300 mm in the east to 2500 mm in the west.

Flora
The ecoregion comprises a mosaic of savannas and wetlands, with islands of forest and gallery forests along rivers. Flooding and fire are important ecological factors.

Fauna
The ecoregion is home to the blue-throated macaw (Ara glaucogularis), which is critically endangered.

People

The Llanos de Moxos was the setting for pre-Columbian agriculture, and appears to have been an early center of plant domestication. The inhabitants constructed agricultural earthworks: raised fields, causeways, canals, and about 4700 forested mounds over a 50,000 square kilometer area. Construction lasted from about 8850 BCE to about 1450 CE. Cultivation included manioc from about 8350 BCE, squash from about 8250 BCE, and maize from about 4,850 BCE. Several domestic crops, including manioc, squash, peanut, some varieties of chili and some beans, are genetically very close to wild species living in the Llanos de Moxos, suggesting that they were domesticated there. The people made decorated pottery, wove cotton cloth, and in some places buried their dead in large urns.

Although Europeans arrived in South America in the late 15th century, they did not come to settle in the Llanos de Moxos until the late 17th century. The missions established by Jesuit missionaries in the 17th and 18th centuries became many of the modern towns in the region.

Since the 1950s, ranching has become the most important industry, and ranches dominate the landscape.

Jesuit Missions of Moxos

The Jesuit Missions of Moxos are located in the Llanos de Moxos, while the Jesuit Missions of Chiquitos are in the Chiquitania region to the southeast.

Conservation and threats
A 2017 assessment found that 96,126 km2, or 77%, of the ecoregion is in protected areas.

See also
 Chiquitania
 Jesuit Missions of Chiquitos
 1491: New Revelations of the Americas Before Columbus
 Mamoré–Guaporé linguistic area

References

External links

Early and Middle Holocene Hunter-Gatherer Occupations in Western Amazonia: The Hidden Shell Middens

Tropical and subtropical grasslands, savannas, and shrublands
Ecoregions of Bolivia
Ecoregions of Brazil
Geography of Beni Department
Grasslands of Bolivia
Grasslands of Brazil
Neotropical ecoregions
Ramsar sites in Bolivia